Tegakkan Bendera Kita is a Malaysian patriotic and national song. It was played by Sudirman Arshad on 1982.

Lyrics
Hormatilah bendera kita
Ia lambang negara
Bersatu padu kita dibawahnya
Hidup berkeluarga

Putih merah biru kuning
Warna bendera kita
Berkibar-kibar megah
Di angkasa
Kemegahan semua

Tegakkan bendera kita

English translations
Honor our flag
It's the nation emblem
We united under it
Living as a family

White red blue yellow
The color of our flag
Proudly streaming
In heaven (In the air)
Pride of all (of us)

Raise our flag

See also
Negaraku (National anthem)
Jalur Gemilang
Tanggal 31 Ogos
List of Malaysian patriotic songs

References 

Malaysian patriotic songs
Malaysian culture
Malay-language songs